Vatica congesta is a tree in the family Dipterocarpaceae, native to Borneo. The specific epithet congesta means "congested or combined", referring to the inflorescences.

Description
The inflorescences bear cream flowers.

Distribution and habitat
Vatica congesta is endemic to Borneo.

Conservation
Vatica congesta has been assessed as endangered on the IUCN Red List. It is threatened mainly by land conversion for agriculture and plantations. It is also threatened by logging for its timber.

References

congesta
Endemic flora of Borneo
Plants described in 1967